The Newton is a series of personal digital assistants (PDAs) developed and marketed by Apple Computer, Inc. An early device in the PDA category (the Newton originated the term), it was the first to feature handwriting recognition. Apple started developing the platform in 1987 and shipped the first devices in August 1993. Production officially ended on February 27, 1998. Newton devices ran on a proprietary operating system, Newton OS; examples include Apple's MessagePad series and the eMate 300, and other companies also released devices running on Newton OS. Most Newton devices were based on the ARM 610 RISC processor and all featured handwriting-based input.

The Newton was considered technologically innovative at its debut, but a combination of factors, including its high price and early problems with its handwriting recognition feature, limited its sales. This led to Apple ultimately discontinuing the platform at the direction of Steve Jobs in 1998, a year after his return to the company.

Development

The Newton project was a personal digital assistant platform. The PDA category did not exist for most of Newton's genesis, and the phrase "personal digital assistant" was coined relatively late in the development cycle by Apple's CEO John Sculley, the driving force behind the project. Larry Tesler determined that an advanced, low-power processor was needed for sophisticated graphics manipulation. He found Hermann Hauser, who had developed the Acorn RISC Machine that utilized what became known as the ARM architecture, and put together Advanced RISC Machines, now Arm Ltd.

A smaller design was then designed by Jonathan Ive. 

Although PDAs had been developing since the original Psion Organiser in 1984, the Newton has left one particular lasting impression: the term personal digital assistant was first coined to refer to the Newton.

According to former Apple CEO John Sculley, the company invested approximately $100 million to develop Newton.

Later history and cancellation
The Newton was considered innovative at its debut, but it suffered from its high price and problems with the handwriting recognition element, its most anticipated feature. The handwriting software was barely ready by 1993 and its tendency to misread characters was widely derided in the media. This was parodied in The Simpsons episode "Lisa on Ice", where a scene makes fun of the Newton's handwriting recognition turning "Beat up Martin" into "Eat up Martha". Garry Trudeau also mocked the Newton in a weeklong arc of his comic strip Doonesbury, portraying it as a costly toy that served the same function as a cheap notepad, and using its accuracy problems to humorous effect. In one panel, Michael Doonesbury's Newton misreads the words "Catching on?" as "Egg Freckles", a phrase that became widely repeated as symbolic of the Newton's problems. This phrase was subsequently included as a trigger for an Easter egg in later editions of the MessagePad, producing a panel from the strip when it was entered on the device. In acknowledgement of the strip, Apple subsequently gifted a MessagePad to Trudeau. Although the software improved substantially in Newton OS 2.0, it was not enough to inspire strong sales.

The Newton became popular in some industries, notably the medical field. However, the debut of the competing Palm Pilot substantially reduced its market share. Apple struggled to find a new direction for the Newton, and when Steve Jobs returned to the company in 1997, he killed the product line. He was critical of the device's weak performance, the management of the development team, and the stylus, which he disliked as it prevented the use of the fingers. Furthermore with Apple already suffering heavy losses which jeopardized its survival, this made the unprofitable Newton a tempting target to axe. Jobs was likely also motivated by the fact that the Newton was the pet project of his old adversary John Sculley. 

However, Jobs saw potential in the technology and concept, if not the execution, and eventually led Apple to create its multi-touch devices inspired by FingerWorks, the iPhone and iPad.

Product details

Application software 
Most Newton devices were pre-loaded with a variety of software to aid in personal data organization and management. This included such applications as Notes, Names, and Dates, as well as a variety of productivity tools such as a calculator, conversion calculators (metric conversions, currency conversions, etc), time-zone maps, etc. In later/2.x versions of the Newton OS these applications were refined, and new ones were added, such as the Works word processor and the Newton Internet Enabler, as well as the inclusion of bundled 3rd party applications, such as the QuickFigure Works spreadsheet (a "lite" version of Pelicanware's QuickFigure Pro), Pocket Quicken, the NetHopper web browser, and the Netstrategy EnRoute email client. Various Newton applications had full import/export capabilities with popular desktop office suite and PIM (Personal Information Manager) application file formats, primarily by making use of Apple's bundled Newton Connection Utilities and also the Newton Connection Kit, which was sold separately and only worked for Newton devices that used the 1.x versions of the Newton OS.

Notes
The Notes application allowed users to create small documents that could contain text that had been typed, or that had been recognized from handwriting, as well as free-hand sketches, "Shapes", and "ink text". 

 In version 2.0 of the Newton OS, the Notes application (as well as Names) could accept what Apple termed "stationery", 3rd-party created plug-in modules that could extend the functionality of the basic applications.

One of the new types of Notes stationery added to Newton OS 2.0 was a hierarchical, bullet-ed, collapsible, multi-line "Checklist", an implementation of outliner software. This could be used for organizing tasks, "to do" lists, sub-tasks, etc.  Each bullet point could contain as many lines of text as desired. A bullet point could be dragged and placed underneath another bullet point, thus forming a hierarchical outline/tree. When a bullet point was dragged, the entire sub-tree of child bullet points underneath it (if any) would be dragged along as well. If a bullet point had child bullet points, tapping the parent's bullet point once would "roll up" all the children ("windowshade" effect). Tapping the parent bullet point again would make the children re-appear. Because this functionality arrived in Newton OS 2.0, several third parties made similar software before for OS 1.x Newton machines, the most notable of which was Dyno Notepad, released in 1993.

Names
The Names application was used for storing contacts. Contacts created either on the Newton device or on a Windows or Macintosh desktop PIM could be synchronized to each other.  Entering a date in Names for fields such as birthday or anniversary automatically created corresponding repeating events in the Dates application. Each contact had an attached free-form notes field available to it, that could contain any mix of interleaved text, ink text, Shapes, or Sketches. Like Notes, Names could be extended by developers, to create special new categories of contacts with specialized pre-defined fields. Names shipped with three types of contacts, "people", "companies", and "groups", but a developer could define new types, for instance "client", "patient", etc. Stand Alone Software, Inc. also created a Newton software package called the Stationery Construction Kit, which allowed users to make stationery themselves without aid of any other tools.

Dates
Dates supplied calendar, events, meeting, and alarms functions, including an integrated "to do" list manager.  It offered many different display and navigation styles, including a list view, graphical day "time blocking" view, or a week, month, or year grid. As with Names and Notes, Dates items created either on the Newton or on a Windows or Macintosh desktop PIM could be synchronized to each other.

Hardware models

From Apple:
 MessagePad (also known as the H1000, OMP or Original MessagePad)
 MessagePad 100 (same hardware as OMP, but newer system version)
 MessagePad 110
 MessagePad 120
 MessagePad 130
 eMate 300
 MessagePad 2000
 MessagePad 2100

From Motorola:
 Motorola Marco

From Sharp:
 Sharp ExpertPad PI-7000 (equivalent to OMP)
 Sharp ExpertPad PI-7100 (equivalent to MP 100)

From Digital Ocean:
 Tarpon
 Seahorse

From Siemens:
 Siemens Note Phone

From Harris:
 Harris SuperTech 2000

Operating system and programming environment
NewtonScript is an advanced object-oriented programming language, developed by Apple employee Walter Smith.  Some programmers complained about the $1000 cost of the Toolbox programming environment. Additionally, it required learning a new way of programming.

Newton technology after cancellation

Before the Newton project was canceled, it was "spun off" into an Apple wholly owned subsidiary company, Newton, Inc. 

Speculation continued for several years that Apple might release a new PDA with some Newton technology or collaborate with Palm. Feeding a bit of speculation, Apple put the "Print Recognizer" part of the Newton 2.1 handwriting recognition system into Mac OS X v10.2 (known as "Jaguar"). It can be used with graphics tablets to seamlessly input handwritten printed text anywhere there was an insertion point on the screen. This technology, known as "Inkwell", appears in the System Preferences whenever a tablet input device is plugged in. Larry Yaeger was the author of the original Rosetta recognizer on the Newton, and was also responsible for porting it to Mac OS X.

At an All Things Digital conference in 2004, Steve Jobs made reference to a new "Apple PDA" which the company had developed but had decided not to bring to market.

Newton emulation
Since 2004, the Einstein Project has been working on emulating the Newton for use as an alternative OS on other platforms. It is currently available for the Sharp Zaurus, Apple's Mac OS X, Nokia Maemo, Microsoft Windows, and the Pepper Pad 3. The emulator is an open source project, but requires an original Newton ROM to be installed in order to function. iPhones and iPads run Einstein since September 2010. The Android operating system runs Einstein since March 2011.

Future
A possible Newton revival was at one time a common source of speculation among the Macintosh user base. Patent applications were issued for a tablet based Macintosh. 

In September 2009, Michael Tchao, who pitched the original Newton concept to John Sculley, returned to Apple. Michael Tchao is now the VP of iPad Product Marketing.

Development
Programs have been written for the Newton since its cancellation, including an RSS reader.

In popular culture
The Apple Newton and its poor handwriting recognition was lampooned on the episode of The Simpsons titled "Lisa on Ice" in 1994.

In the 1995 anime series Neon Genesis Evangelion, handheld devices modeled on the Newton can be seen multiple times, serving various internal functions within NERV.

In the 1995 film Under Siege 2: Dark Territory, the main character Casey Ryback (Steven Seagal) connects an Apple Newton PDA to the telephone network of the hijacked train on which the film is set, and sends a fax to his workplace, which is then forwarded to Admiral Bates, Ryback's contact at the Pentagon. The hijackers subsequently discover and hack the Newton, thus learning of Ryback's presence on the train.

In the 1998 interactive video game The X-Files Game, the main character uses an Apple Newton to make notes, read e-mail and navigate the different locations of the game.

During Apple's March 21, 2016, keynote conference, a celebration video called "40 Years in 40 Seconds" was unveiled. The video featured flashing text of names from Apple's most notable products and taglines in their forty-year history, including Newton. However, in Newton's case, it was the only name depicted in the video being explicitly scratched out, mimicking how users deleted text on the device, and referencing the full cancellation of the product line.

In the TV series For All Mankind season 3, episode 1, an alternative 1992 history Newton MessagePad with backlit (possibly color) display is shown at a briefing scene.

See also
 iPhone
 Pocket-sized computer
 iPad

References

External links

Newton technical documents for programmers
 The Newton Application Architecture
 Newton Tool Kit (NTK) Integrated Development Environment Manual
 The Newton Application Architecture
 A quick introduction to programming in NewtonScript using NTK
 The NewtonScript Programming Language (Apple Manual).
 Newton Programmer's Guide, OS 2.0
 Newton Programmer's Guide, OS 2.1 Addendum
 Newton Programmer's Reference, OS 2.0
 Newton OS 2.1 Engineering Documents
 Explanation of NewtonScript Prototyping 
 Newton User Interface Specification Guide

General historical information on pen computing
 Notes on the (relatively unknown) History of Pen-based Computing
 
 Annotated Bibliography in Pen Computing

 
Apple Inc. personal digital assistants
Handwriting recognition
Personal digital assistant software
Computer-related introductions in 1993
Products introduced in 1993
Products and services discontinued in 1998